Ronaldo Cezar Soares dos Santos (born 7 December 2000), simply known as Ronaldo, is a Brazilian footballer who plays as a forward for Bulgarian First League club Levski Sofia.

Club career

São Caetano
Born in Rio de Janeiro, Ronaldo was a São Caetano youth graduate. He made his first team debut on 22 January 2020, starting in a 2–3 Campeonato Paulista Série A2 away loss against Penapolense, and scored his first senior goal on 7 March by netting his team's second in a 2–1 home win over Atibaia.

Bahia
In November 2020, Ronaldo signed for Bahia for the ensuing campaign, being initially assigned to the under-23 squad. He first appeared with the main squad the following 28 July, starting in a 0–2 loss at Atlético Mineiro, for the season's Copa do Brasil.

Ronaldo made his Série A debut on 1 August 2021, coming on as a late substitute for Rodriguinho in a 0–1 home loss against Sport Recife.

Levski Sofia
On 16 June 2022, Ronaldo moved to Europe, signing a 3-year deal with Bulgarian First League club Levski Sofia.

Career statistics

Honours
São Caetano
Campeonato Paulista Série A2: 2020

Bahia
Copa do Nordeste: 2021

References

External links
EC Bahia profile 

2000 births
Living people
Brazilian footballers
Footballers from Rio de Janeiro (city)
Association football forwards
Campeonato Brasileiro Série A players
Campeonato Brasileiro Série B players
Campeonato Brasileiro Série D players
Associação Desportiva São Caetano players
Esporte Clube Bahia players
PFC Levski Sofia players
First Professional Football League (Bulgaria) players
Brazilian expatriate footballers
Brazilian expatriate sportspeople in Bulgaria
Expatriate footballers in Bulgaria